Entomophthoraceae is a family of fungi in the order Entomophthorales. This has been supported by molecular phylogenetic analysis (Gryganskyi et al. 2012). Most species in the family are obligately entomopathogenic. There are two subfamilies, Erynioideae and Entomophthoroideae, which were proposed in 2005.

Genera
Batkoa  – 10 spp.
Entomophaga  – 22 spp.
Entomophthora  – 63 spp.
Erynia  – 27 spp.
Eryniopsis  – 5 spp.
Furia  – 16 spp.
Massospora  – 5 spp.
Orthomyces  – 1 sp.
Pandora Humber 2005 - 31 spp.
Strongwellsea  – 8 spp.
Tarichium  – 26 spp.
Zoophthora  – 38 spp.

References

Entomophthorales
Fungus families
Taxa described in 1874